Minas Chalkiadakis (born 5 February 1995) is a Greek professional footballer who plays as a forward for Super League 2 club Irodotos.

Career
He start his career from Panathinaikos F.C. who was captain in u20 team from the club. In his career played for teams such as AEZ Zakakiou Cyprus, Anagennisi Karditsa, PAE Chania or FC Botoșani, among others.

References

External links
 
 
 Minas Chalkiadakis at lpf.ro

1995 births
Living people
Footballers from Heraklion
Greek footballers
Association football forwards
Cypriot Second Division players
AEZ Zakakiou players
Anagennisi Karditsa F.C. players
Football League (Greece) players
Panthrakikos F.C. players
AO Chania F.C. players
Liga I players
FC Botoșani players
Greek expatriate footballers
Greek expatriate sportspeople in Cyprus
Expatriate footballers in Cyprus
Greek expatriate sportspeople in Romania
Expatriate footballers in Romania